Benjamin Remington (christened 12 August 1753 – date of death unknown) was an English first-class cricketer.

Born at Boughton Monchelsea, Remington made his debut in first-class cricket for England against Hampshire at Alfresford in June 1779. In August of that year he appeared for Kent against Surrey at Laleham Burway. In 1780, he appeared in two first-class matches for Sir Horatio Mann's personal XI against the Duke of Dorset's XI at Bishopsbourne. In that same year he appeared twice for England against Hampshire, before making six first-class appearances in 1881, including for East Kent against West Kent. His next first-class appearance came two years later in 1883 for East Kent against West Kent at Sevenoaks. Across thirteen first-class matches, Remington scored 323 runs, with a high score of 62. His brothers, Thomas and Michael, both played first-class cricket.

References

External links

1753 births
Date of death unknown
People from Boughton Monchelsea
English cricketers
Non-international England cricketers
Kent cricketers
Sir H. Mann's XI cricketers
East Kent cricketers